Güneyköy can refer to:

 Güneyköy, Alanya
 Güneyköy, Emirdağ
 Güneyköy, Gazipaşa
 Güneyköy, Gündoğmuş
 Güneyköy, Ilgaz
 Güneyköy, Kargı
 Güneyköy, Yalova